The Raigam Tele'es Best Upcoming Teledrama Actress Award is presented annually in Sri Lanka by the Kingdom of Raigam companies.

The award was first given in 2005.

Award list in each year

References

Upcoming Actress
Awards for actresses